Benton Township is one of twelve townships in Franklin County, Illinois.  As of the 2010 census, its population was 8,972 and it contained 4,220 housing units.

Geography

Cities, towns, villages
 Benton (east three-quarters)
 Hanaford

Unincorporated towns
 Steel City

Extinct towns
 Groat
 Logan
 Smothersville

Cemeteries
The township contains these nine cemeteries: Baxter, County Farm, Drummond, Franklin, Masonic and Odd Fellows, Memorial Park, New Union, Rea and Swofford.

Major highways
  Interstate 57
  Illinois Route 14
  Illinois Route 34

Airports and landing strips
 Bessie RLA Airport

Lakes
 Vernons Lake

Demographics

Political districts
 Illinois's 12th congressional district
 State House District 117
 State Senate District 59

Notes

Adjacent townships 
 Ewing Township (north)
 Northern Township (northeast)
 Eastern Township (east)
 Cave Township (southeast)
 Frankfort Township (south)
 Denning Township (southwest)
 Browning Township (west)
 Browning Township (northwest)

References
 
 United States Census Bureau 2007 TIGER/Line Shapefiles
 United States National Atlas

External links
 City-Data.com
 Illinois State Archives

Townships in Franklin County, Illinois
Townships in Illinois